Penicillium menonorum is a monoverticillate, non-vesiculate species of the genus Penicillium which was isolated from rhizosphere soil in Korea. Penicillium menonorum can promote plant growth and improve soil fertility

References

Further reading 
 

menonorum
Fungi described in 2011